Events from the year 1958 in South Korea.

Incumbents
President: Rhee Syng-man
Vice President: Chang Myon

Events
Korean Publishers Cooperative is established.

Births

 20 June - Jang Jung-hee.
 19 August - Lee Won-woo.
 Dae Sung Lee.

See also
List of South Korean films of 1958
Years in Japan
Years in North Korea

References

 
South Korea
Years of the 20th century in South Korea
1950s in South Korea
South Korea